Environmental Health and Preventive Medicine is a peer-reviewed open access medical journal covering preventive medicine and environmental health. It was established in 1996 and is the official journal of the Japanese Society for Hygiene. It was published by BioMed Central until 2021 before taken over by Komiyama Printing Co. Ltd. The editor-in-chief is Yoshihiro Kokubo (National Cerebral and Cardiovascular Center, Osaka, Japan). According to the Journal Citation Reports, the journal has a 2020 impact factor of 3.674, and ranked in the first quartile of the category for public, environmental and occupational health.

References

External links

BioMed Central academic journals
Publications established in 1996
Bimonthly journals
English-language journals
Preventive medicine journals
Environmental health journals
Academic journals associated with learned and professional societies of Japan